The 2020 Canberra Capitals season is the 37th season for the franchise in the Women's National Basketball League (WNBL).

University of Canberra remain as the owners and naming rights partner of the Capitals for the seventh consecutive season.

Due to the COVID-19 pandemic, a North Queensland hub is set to host the season. The season was originally 2020–21 and would be traditionally played over several months across the summer, however this seasons scheduling has been condensed. The six-week season will see Townsville, Cairns and Mackay host a 56-game regular season fixture, plus a four-game final series (2 x semi-finals, preliminary final and grand final). Each team will contest 14 games starting on 12 November, with the grand final scheduled for 20 December.

Roster

Standings

Results

Regular season

Finals

References

External links
Canberra Capitals Official website

2020 WNBL season
WNBL seasons by team
Basketball,Canberra Capitals
2020 in basketball
Australia,Canberra Capitals
2020–21 in Australian basketball